This is a list of permanent representatives (or ambassadors) of the Republic of China and the People's Republic of China to the United Nations (UN). The current office holder is Zhang Jun, who took office in 2019. Both governments insist on being the sole legitimate representative of all of China, for details of their UN membership, see China and the United Nations. The Chinese representative’s office is located at 350 East 35th Street at Midtown Manhattan in New York City.

1946–1971 

1971–present 
 Representing the

See also 

 Foreign relations of China
 List of current Permanent Representatives to the United Nations

References 

 New Permanent Representative of China Presents Credentials https://www.un.org/press/en/2019/bio5234.doc.htm

External links 
 

 
China